Mio figlio Nerone (literally: My Son Nero), released in the US as Nero's Mistress is a 1956 Italian historical comedy film directed by Steno and starring Alberto Sordi, Vittorio De Sica, Gloria Swanson and Brigitte Bardot, with cinematography by Mario Bava. It depicts a visit by the Roman Emperor Nero and his entourage to a coastal villa.

The movie was released in Italy in September 1956 and in France in October 1957.  
The US dub, released in 1962, was recut to a substantially different film, shifting the emphasis from Agrippina to Poppaea (as the title reflects).

Plot
The young emperor Nero proves himself spoiled, childish and unable to cope with the government of Rome. His domineering mother Agrippina and the wise philosopher Seneca try to make change the personality of the emperor, but nothing can make Nero into a wise and honorable ruler. Agrippina then takes advantage of a poetic and theatrical failure of Nero to kill him and take over the government of Rome. Seneca initially supports the woman, but then plays a double game and warns Nero about the conspiracy. Agrippina smartly lays the blame on the Christians and on Seneca, who could be sentenced to death. However Nero is easily deceived again and proved magnanimous, forgiving all.The trouble starts at court for the umpteenth time when Nero finds out that Seneca had lied about the "poetic art" of the emperor, saying to the people that Nero sings and performs worse than a stupid monkey ...

Cast
 Alberto Sordi - Nero 
 Vittorio De Sica - Seneca the Younger
 Gloria Swanson - Agrippina the Younger
 Brigitte Bardot - Poppaea 
 Ciccio Barbi - Anicetus 
 Mario Carotenuto - Creperius
 Mino Doro - Corbulo
 Enzo Furlai - Segimerus 
 Agnese Dubbini - Ugolilla
 Georgia Moll - Lydia

Production
The movie was filmed in 1955 with interior scenes filmed at Rome's Cinecitta studio.

The movie is notable for the first appearance of Brigitte Bardot as a blonde. A natural brunette, she was asked by the director to appear as a blonde as he felt that it was appropriate to her character of an intriguing and alluring treacherous woman. Rather than wear a wig Bardot decided to dye her hair. She was so pleased with the results that she decided to retain the hair colour.

References

External links
 

1956 films
1950s historical comedy films
Italian historical comedy films
Peplum films
CinemaScope films
1950s Italian-language films
Films set in ancient Rome
Films set in the Roman Empire
Depictions of Nero on film
Cultural depictions of Agrippina the Younger
Cultural depictions of Seneca the Younger
Cultural depictions of Poppaea Sabina
Sword and sandal films
1956 comedy films
1950s Italian films